Willdenowia may refer to:

Willdenowia (journal), a botanical journal
Willdenowia (plant), a genus of plants